In mathematics, the Faber polynomials Pm of a Laurent series

are the polynomials such that

vanishes at z=0.

References

Polynomials